James Ramon Jones (November 6, 1921 – May 9, 1977) was an American novelist known for his explorations of World War II and its aftermath. He won the 1952 National Book Award for his first published novel, From Here to Eternity, which was adapted for the big screen immediately and made into a television series a generation later.

Life
James Ramon Jones was born and raised in Robinson, Illinois, the son of Ramon and Ada M. (née Blessing) Jones.  He enlisted in the United States Army in 1939 at the age of 17 and served in the 25th Infantry Division, 27th Infantry Regiment before and during World War II, first in Hawaii at Schofield Barracks on Oahu, then in combat on Guadalcanal at the Battle of Mount Austen, the Galloping Horse, and the Sea Horse, where he was wounded in his ankle. He returned to the US and was discharged in July 1944. He also worked as a journalist covering the Vietnam War.

His wartime experiences inspired some of his most famous works, the so-called war trilogy. He witnessed the Japanese attack on Pearl Harbor, which led to his first published novel, From Here to Eternity (1951).  The Thin Red Line (1962) reflected his combat experiences on Guadalcanal and Whistle (posthumous, 1978) was based on his hospital stay in Memphis, Tennessee, recovering from surgery on an ankle he had reinjured on the island.

Jones was the father of two children including Kaylie Jones, an author best known for A Soldier's Daughter Never Cries, a thinly veiled memoir of the Joneses' life in Paris during the 1960s. (The son Jamie Jones was adopted in France.) Kaylie Jones' novel was made into a film starring Kris Kristofferson, Barbara Hershey and Leelee Sobieski in 1998.  The release of this film, along with the 1998 release of a new film version of The Thin Red Line, directed by Terrence Malick and produced by Robert Michael Geisler and John Roberdeau, sparked a revival of interest in James Jones' life and works. In 2011, Ms. Jones was instrumental in publishing an uncensored edition of James Jones' From Here to Eternity.

Jones assisted in the 1950 formation of the Handy Writers' Colony in Marshall, Illinois, by his then-lover Lowney Handy and her husband Harry Handy. It was funded partly by Harry and, after the financial success of From Here To Eternity, partly by Jones. Originally conceived as a Utopian commune where budding artists could focus exclusively on their writing projects, the colony dissolved after only a few years, because James Jones relocated to France following his marriage to Gloria Mosolino after a fight with Lowney, leaving the colony back in a financially compromised situation in 1957.

Jones died in Southampton, New York, of congestive heart failure and is buried in Poxabogue-Evergreen Cemetery, Bridgehampton, New York. His papers are now held at the Harry Ransom Center at the University of Texas at Austin. His widow, Gloria, died on June 9, 2006. Many of James Jones's books are still available in digital format, including excerpts from They Shall Inherit the Laughter, published as To the End of the War.

Work

Jones called his first novel They Shall Inherit the Laughter. It was a thinly disguised autobiographical novel of his experiences in Robinson immediately after World War II. After several rejections—with various complaints and claims about the work being too shrill and lacking perspective—he abandoned it and began writing From Here to Eternity.

Charles Scribner's Sons published Eternity in 1951, and it won the annual U.S. National Book Award for Fiction.
The Modern Library Board later named it one of the 100 best novels of the 20th century.

His second published novel, Some Came Running (1957), had its roots in the abandoned first effort. In contrast to Eternity, it was savaged by critics. They were especially harsh about the frequently misspelled words and punctuation errors; they did not recognize that such elements were a conscious style choice by Jones to evoke the provinciality of the novel's characters and setting. Jones apparently played around with this style in several short stories written at about the same time as Some Came Running (later collected in The Ice-Cream Headache and Other Stories), only to abandon it by the time he finished The Thin Red Line in 1962, in favor of the blunt but more grammatically sound style most associated with him today. Some Came Running was immediately adapted as a film starring Frank Sinatra, Dean Martin, and Shirley MacLaine, which was critically acclaimed and nominated for five Oscars.

His novella The Pistol (1959) was drawn from his military experience, not unlike From Here to Eternity and The Thin Red Line.
 
Jones did not live long enough to finish his last novel, Whistle; he knew he was dying of congestive heart failure while writing it. However, he left behind copious notes for Willie Morris to complete the final section after his death, and Whistle was published a year later, in 1978. That completed Jones's war trilogy (the first parts being From Here to Eternity and The Thin Red Line), of which he wrote: "It will say just about everything I have ever had to say, or will ever have to say, on the human condition of war and what it means to us, as against what we claim it means to us."

Bibliography

Novels 
Some Came Running (1957) 
Go to the Widow-Maker (1967)
The Merry Month of May (1971)
A Touch of Danger (1973)

From Here to Eternity trilogy
From Here to Eternity (1951) 
The Thin Red Line (1962) 
Whistle (1978) (completed by Willie Morris)

Short fiction 
Collections
The Ice-Cream Headache and Other Stories (1968)
To the End of the War (2011)
Stories

Non-fiction
Viet Journal (1974)
WW II (1975)

Adaptations
From Here to Eternity was adapted as a film of the same name in 1953; as a television miniseries of the same name in 1979; as a TV series of the same name in 1980. A musical adaption of the book opened in London in 2013.

Some Came Running was adapted as a 1958 film of the same name.

The Thin Red Line was adapted as 1964 and 1998 films of the same name. (Elements of The Pistol were included in the 1964 film adaptation of The Thin Red Line.)

References

External links

The James Jones Literary Society
James Jones Papers. Yale Collection of American Literature, Beinecke Rare Book and Manuscript Library.
James Jones' Collection  at the Harry Ransom Center at The University of Texas at Austin
Handy Writers' Colony Collection . Archives/Special Collections, Brookens Library, University of Illinois at Springfield.

Read Jones's interview with The Paris Review

1921 births
1977 deaths
20th-century American male writers
20th-century American novelists
American male novelists
Esquire (magazine) people
Military personnel from Illinois
National Book Award winners
Novelists from Illinois
People from Robinson, Illinois
United States Army non-commissioned officers
United States Army personnel of World War II